The Ukrainian Research Institute of Archival Affairs and Record Keeping (URIAARK)

History of URIAARK 
The Ukrainian Research Institute of Archival Affairs and Record Keeping is a government budget research agency in a system of state archives of Ukraine and is subordinated to the State Archival Service of Ukraine.

The main objective of the institute is setting and solving scientific, theoretical, normative and methodological problems connected with the development of Archival Affairs and Record Keeping.

The Institute began to function under orders from Chief of Archival Administration under the Cabinet of Minister of Ukraine, November 1, 1994 number 45 on the basis of the Verkhovna Rada of Ukraine of 24 December 1993 № 3815-XII “On the Order of bringing into force the Law of Ukraine “On National Archival Fond and Archival Institutions” and Resolution of Cabinet of Ministers of Ukraine on 16 May 1994 № 311 “On founding in Kyiv the Ukrainian State Research Institute of Archival Affairs and Record Keeping”. Components of the institute were: department of archives studies with archival history and theory of archives sectors, conservation of documents, National archive fund formation, research and reference system and accounting documents; records department; research and information department. 

In 1998 to improve management institute and rational frame the structure was reorganized as follows: department of history and theory of archives, department of physical and chemical research, department of theory and technology of national archive fund, department of scientific and help staff and accounting documents, the department documentation, scientific information department with scientific and technical information sector. In January 2002 the current structure of the institute was established. In 2001 because of the reorganization the name of the Institute the term "State" was removed.

The first  appointed  director of  URIAARK was  V.P. Lyahotsky (candidate of historical sciences). During 2001-2009 Matyash I.B.(professor, doctor of historical sciences);and now Garanin O.Y. (candidate of historical sciences) holds the position of director.

In April 2003, according to the order of Certifying Board of the Ministry of Education and Science of Ukraine from 02.28.2003, the (protocol number 112) in the institute is open department of postgraduate distance learning, speciality 07.00.06 - historiography, and special historical disciplines, and in November 2004 at the graduate speciality was opened 07.00.01 - History of Ukraine (Ministry of Education and Science of Ukraine from 01.11.2004, № 834). For both specialities graduated seven students and continues to study five graduate students.

In May 2003 under the Ministry of Education and Science of Ukraine of May 22, 2003 № 265, according to the resolution of the Presidium of the Supreme Attestation Commission of Ukraine on May 21, 2003 № 3-11/5 the Institute established a specialized academic council K 26.864 .01 with the right of consideration and protection of theses for the degree of candidate of historical sciences specialities: 07.00.06 - historiography, and special historical disciplines, 27.00.02 - Documents and Archives. During this period, Specialized Academic Council defended 44 thesis for the degree of candidate of historical sciences.

The Institute researchers conducted more than 170 scientific and teaching materials including the manuals, guides, industry and government standards, rules, orders, regulations, industry standards, guidelines, analytical reviews and so forth.
Together with the State Committee on Archives of Ukraine, archival institutions, academic institutions and other organizations 26 scientific conferences, readings, seminars, round tables were conducted. Among them, the international scientific conference "Ukrainian Archives: Current Status and Perspectives," Archival and library science in Ukraine struggle for liberation era (1917-1921 biennium), "Archives - part of information resources", "Archives and Area Studies: Ways of integration", "Current state and prospects of Documentation", "Archives Studies as science" and scientific and practical seminar on "Archival ucrainica: search, registration and acquisition of archives".
Institute launched Issue 5 periodicals and publications, 2 of which (the annual "Studies of Archives and Records" and archeographic annual "Interests") are included to scientific professional publications in Ukraine, which can  publish results of dissertations for the degree doctoral degrees.
Among the Institute staff - 3 doctors and 16 candidates. 2 employees with academic rank of professor, 5 - Senior Scientist, 3 - Associate Professor.

The staff of the Institute is noted by the Cabinet Council of Ukraine and the Ukrainian Union of Ethnographers Gratitude (2004). Employees of the institute were awarded with certificates of honor and gratitude of the State Committee on Archives of Ukraine, Ministry of Education and Science of Ukraine, the Ministry of Culture and Tourism of Ukraine, Kyiv city and Solomensky district administrations.

Structure of URIAARK 

 Department of Archives Studies
 Sector of reference and accounting documents
 Department of physical, chemical and biological researches
 Records management department
 Research and information department
 Sector of scientific and technical information

Principal activities of URIAARK 

 development of theoretical and applied problems of Archival Studies;
 regulatory, organizational, methodological and information-analytical support of state archival institutions of the State Committee on Archives of Ukraine;
 coordination of scientific activities of the state archival institutions in Ukraine;
 international cooperation with relevant institutions and organizations;
 training of scientific personnel for the archival field;
 preparation of materials for production of periodic and aperiodic publications of archive science and other special historical science;
 conferences, symposia, seminars, including international;
 participation in the formation and content of training and expertise of training professionals in the field of archives, records and record keeping.

URIAARK Postgraduate program 

Since February 28, 2003 in the Ukrainian Research Institute Archives and Records opened postgraduate specialty 07.00.06 - historiography, and special historical disciplines, and from November 1, 2004 opened a specialty 07.00.01 - History of Ukraine. Opening of the graduate program provides a complete system of multilevel training of scientific personnel for the archival field, qualitative growth of archival education in universities of different levels of accreditation, supporting the state archival institutions with highly qualified scientific personnel.
Activities are regulated by Regulations of the postgraduate training of scientific and pedagogical staff (Cabinet Resolution on 01.03.1999 № 309)
The Institute has two departments - Archival Studies and Documentation, Research is closely linked to sectors of the Postgraduate program.

Scientific support training graduate students - are 6 Doctors of History and 11 Candidates of Historical Sciences.
Training graduate students at the graduate institute are: - the state order - at the expense of the entities and individuals under contract - based on agreements between the institute and archives.
Currently (beginning of 2011) in graduate study there are five graduate students: 2 - first year, 2 - third and 1 - fourth year of study.
Of these, specialty 07.00.06 - historiography, and special historical disciplines - 4 graduate and specialty 07.00.01 - History of Ukraine - 1 graduate student.

International Relations of URIAARK 

The last decade of the Institute is marked with strengthening of creative contacts with foreign colleagues: All-Russian Research Institute of Documentation and Archives, Belarusian Research Institute of Documentation and Archives.

Trilateral Ukrainian-Russian-Belarusian agreement on cooperation in the field of Archival and Records was signed November 2, 1999 It became the subject of a full-scale cooperation in the implementation of joint research projects, publishing collections of documents and scientific publications, conducting scientific and practical conferences, seminars, symposiums, mutual review of research works and theses, information on routine work and activities (conferences, seminars, etc.), exchange of bibliographic and reference information in the field of documentation and archives, and also scientific and methodological developments in all areas.
The result of fruitful cooperation of The Institute with the Institute of History and Archives of the Russian State Humanitarian University was the publication in 2008, "Ukrainian archival Encyclopedia (Ukrainian archival Encyclopedia / State Committee of Ukraine. Its importance lies in the consolidation of achievements of national archival science and determine its place among other branches of historical science and related subjects, representing the historical experience of Ukrainian archives and their prominent representatives clarify the role of Ukraine in the world Archival space. This goal allows for release in the last decade, science humanities from "classic Soviet ideologies", "return" and the names of prominent Ukrainian archivists and promotes increased access to archival information.
Together with the Gomel State University named after F. Skoryna under an agreement signed in 1999, prepared a collection of articles and documents about the famous historian, archivists, teacher-MV Dovnar Zapolskiy (Даследчык гісторыі трох народаў: М. В. Доўнар-Запольскі: Зб. навук. артыкулаў і дакументаў / Гомельскі дзярж. ун-т імя Ф. Скарыны; Брянскі дзярж. пед. ін-т імя І. Пятроўскага; УДНДІАСД, Речыцкі гарадскі выканкам; Пад рэд. В.М. Лебедзевай. - Гомель; Рэчыца, 2000. - 293 с.); signed a bibliography and a register of archival collections that contain documents about the life and career of MV-Zapolskogo Dovnar (Мітрафан Віктаравіч Доўнар-Запольскі: Біябібліягр. паказальнік / Гомельскі дзярж. ун-т імя Ф. Скарыны; Беларускі навукова-даследчы ін-т дакументазнаўства і архіўнай справы; Нацыянальны архіў Рэспублікі Беларусь; Украінскі дзярж. навукова-даследчы ін-т архіўнай справы і дакументазнаўства; Бранскі дзярж. пед. ун-т імя акадэміка І. Г. Пятроўскага; Уклад.: В. М. Лебедзева (кіраўнік), В. У. Скалабан, Т. М. Махнач, І. Б. Матяш, Р. У. Рамановскі, С. С. Артамонова та ін. - Выд. 2-е, дапов. - Мінск, 2007. - 168 с.). Employees of the Institute took part in Dovnarivsk Readings (Rechytsia, Belarus), and teachers of the university - in scientific conferences held at the URIAR.

In order to further development of Ukrainian-Canadian scientific and cultural relations in 2007 the Institute has signed a cooperation agreement with the Canadian Institute of Ukrainian Studies, University of Alberta. One of the articles of the agreement provides for detection of archival documents in Canadian archives ukrainika and preparation of joint publications in Ukrainian and English “Archive Ukrainika in Canada. Guide”. In pursuance of that article of the contract director of the Institute Professor. I. Matias monograph was prepared (Matias I. Archival Ukrainika in Canada: Historiography, typology, content / Iryna Matyas, State Committee of Ukraine, URIAR, NAS (National Academy of Sciences) of Ukraine, Institute of Ukrainian Archeology and Source Studiesnamed after M.S. Grushevsky, Canadian Institute for Ukrainian Studies at the University of Alberta - K.: Horobets, 2008. - 152 p.: ill.).
2010 was published a comprehensive guide about documents of Ukrainian cultural heritage and documents of foreign origin connected with history of Ukraine and Ukrainians (archival Ukrainika); the heritage had place in the archives, museums-archives and libraries of Canada (state, private and public) (Archival Ukrainika in Canada: guide/ Eds.: I. Matias (leader), R. Romanovsky, M. Kovtun etc.; State Committee of Ukraine, Russian scientific-research Institute for Archives and Records, Canadian Institute of Ukrainian  Studies in Alberta University. - K., 2010. - 882 p.).
The guide is the result of fruitful cooperation between scientists of the Canadian Institute of Ukrainian Studies and the Ukrainian Research Institute Archives and Records of the National Archives of Ukraine. The publication contains information about the structure and contents of archival documents of Ukrainika, stored in 57 archival institutions in Canada.
Guide also includes a bibliography of archival Ukrainika of Canada, reference tools are index names and index of institutions, organizations, churches. Launch will be held April 19, 2010 the Canadian Embassy in Ukraine (Kyiv, Ukraine). In the near future editions will also be presented at the Canadian Institute of Ukrainian Studies, University of Alberta (Edmonton, Canada).
Effectiveness of scientific cooperation URIAR with foreign archival evidence and publishing institute. To spread scientific ideas in the field of archives, the publication of research results in the theory and methodology of Archival Studies, documentation, and special historical disciplines, the publication of archival documents was established in 1996 academic edition UNDIASD "Studies of Archives and Records, 1998 - archeographic Yearbook "Monuments", 1999 - The interdepartmental scientific collection of "Archives Studies. Archeology. Chronology. " Members of the editorial boards of these publications are M.V. Larin, E.V. Starostin (Russian Federation), A.E. Rybakov, S. Zhumar, M.F. Shumeyko (Belarus). In the yearbook, "Studies of Archives and Records" special section devoted to the development of archives in foreign countries, on the pages of periodicals Institute regularly publishes articles by Russian, Belarusian, Polish, German, Canadian authors.

Print media of URIAARK 

 Scientific annual of "Studio from the archived business and documentation" (original name – «Студії з архівної справи та документознавства»)
 Archaeography annual "Sights" (original name – «Пам’ятки»)
 Interdepartmental scientific collection "Archives. Archaeography. Sources" (original name – «Архівознавство. Археографія. Джерелознавство»)
  Serial edition "Archived and bibliographic sources of the Ukrainian historical idea" (original name – "Архівні та бібліографічні джерела української історичної думки")
 Serial edition "History of the archived business : remembrances, researches, sources" (original name – "Історія архівної справи: спогади, дослідження, джерела")
 Bulletin of Branch service of scientific and technical information from the archived business and documents (original name – Бюлетень Галузевої служби науково-технічної інформації з архівної справи та документознавства)

URIAARK communications with Mass Media 
 The announcement of admission to URIAARK graduate school was published in the newspaper "Osvita Ukrainy" № 45-46 of 20.06.2011.
 During the V International conference of young scientists "History science at the beginning of 21st century: problems, past, present and perspectives" (Kherson, June 2–3, 2011) director of the Institute O. Garanin, taking part in the conference, gave an interview with local television station "Skifia", which was issued on "Tavria news," June 9, 2011.
 Up to the Day of Science, May 21, 2011,  the interview of O. Garanin, URIAARK director, entitled "Reflection of the State" was published in the newspaper "Osvita Ukrainy" № 37-38 of 23.05.2011.
 The notice about the signing of trilateral agreement on cooperation between the Belorussian Research Institute of Records Management and Archival Affairs, the All-Russian Research Institute of Records Management and Archival Affairs and the Ukrainian Research Institute of Archival Affairs and Record Keeping within the framework of the XVII International Scientific Conference "Documentation in an Information Society : International Experience in Documents Managing". Posted on the site "Archivist Bulletin" 5.5.2011.
 The announcement of the presentation of methodical manual "Examination of the value of administrative documents: history, theory, methodology" was issued on the pages of "Іstorychna Pravda", 04.27.2011.
 April 21, 2011 O. Garanin, URIAARM director, took part in a program "The Evening Meetings" on "Culture" radio channel.

Leaders of URIAARK in the chronological order 

 Volodymyr Lyahockyy
 Iryna Matyash
 Iryna Maga
 Oleksandr Garanin
 Vitaliy Skalsky

Reference to the sources 
 Архівні установи України: Довідник. Т.1. Державні архіви/Держкомархів України. УНДІАСД;Редкол.:Г.В.Боряк (голова), І.Б.Матяш, Г.В.,Г.В.Папакін.-2-е вид.,доп.-К.,2005.-692с.-(Архівні зібрання України. Спеціальні довідники). .
 URIAARK

Libraries in Ukraine
Archives in Ukraine
State Archive Service of Ukraine